James Thomson (13 November 1786 – 12 January 1849) was an Irish mathematician, notable for his role in the formation of the thermodynamics school at the University of Glasgow. He was the father of the engineer and physicist James Thomson and the physicist Lord Kelvin.

Life
Born into an Ulster-Scots family on 13 November 1786, he was the fourth son of Agnes Nesbit and James Thomson, a small farmer, at Annaghmore, near Ballynahinch, County Down (the house was later called Spamount), in Ulster. His early education was from his father. At the age of 11 or 12 he had found out for himself the art of dialling. His father sent him to a school at Ballykine, near Ballynahinch, kept by Samuel Edgar, father of John Edgar. Here Thomson soon rose to be an assistant.

Wishing to become a minister of the presbyterian church, in 1810 he entered the University of Glasgow, where he studied for several sessions, supporting himself by teaching in the Ballykine school during the summer. He graduated MA in 1812, and in 1814 he was appointed headmaster of the school of arithmetic, bookkeeping, and geography in the newly established Academical Institution, Belfast; and in 1815 he was professor of mathematics in its collegiate department. Here he proved himself as a teacher. In 1829 the honorary degree of LLD was conferred upon him by the University of Glasgow, where in 1832 he was appointed professor of mathematics. He held this post till his death on 12 January 1849.

He is buried with his family on the northern slopes of the Glasgow Necropolis to the east of the main bridge entrance. The grave is notable due to the modern memorial to Lord Kelvin at its side.

Works
He was the author of the schoolbooks that passed through many editions:
 ‘Arithmetic,’ Belfast, 1819; 72nd ed. London, 1880.
 ‘Trigonometry, Plane and Spherical,’ Belfast, 1820; 4th ed. London, 1844.
 ‘Introduction to Modern Geography,’ Belfast, 1827.
 ‘The Phenomena of the Heavens,’ Belfast, 1827. 
 ‘The Differential and Integral Calculus,’ 1831; 2nd ed. London, 1848.
 ‘Euclid,’ 1834. 
 ‘Atlas of Modern Geography.’ 
 ‘Algebra,’ 1844.

A paper ‘Recollections of the Battle of Ballynahinch, by an Eye-witness,’ which appeared in the Belfast Magazine for February 1825, was from his pen.

Artistic Recognition

He was portrayed by John Graham Gilbert RSA.

Family
In 1817 Thomson married Margaret Gardiner (d.1830), eldest daughter of William Gardiner of Glasgow. They had four sons and three daughters, including James (1822–1892) and William, afterwards Lord Kelvin (1824–1907), the two elder sons.

References

External links
James Thomson at University of Glasgow
 

Irish mathematicians
Irish Presbyterians
People from County Down
Ulster Scots people
1849 deaths
1786 births
William Thomson, 1st Baron Kelvin